Yevhen Heorhiyovych Moisiuk (born 7 October 1979) is a Ukrainian three-star general who serves as the Deputy Commander-in-Chief of the Armed Forces of Ukraine since 29 July 2021.

Biography 
He was born in the city of Chernivtsi, 7 October 1979.

He graduated from the airmobile faculty of the Odessa Military Academy in 2000.

From 2000 to 2004, Moisiuk commanded a platoon and later a company in the 25th Airborne Brigade (Ukraine). From 2004 to 2005, he served as part of the Ukrainian contingent in Iraq. From 2008 to 2009, he served as part of Kosovo Force.

In 2009, he entered the Ivan Chernyakhovsky National Defense University of Ukraine from which he graduated in 2011.

Russo-Ukrainian War 
At the outbreak of the Russo-Ukrainian War, in March 2014, he commanded a detachment of the 25th Airborne Brigade, which advanced to the Russian-Ukrainian border. On March 16, a column of the detachment in the Volnovasky district, near the village of Anatolia, reportedly fired upon pro-Russian activists who were obstructing the movement of the convoy to the border, without any conclusive outcome. The column was forced to spend the night in field conditions. The camp of the detachment was set up in a field, on the slope of a stream, in snowy weather. The next day, after negotiations with pro-Russian activists with the participation of local officials, the convoy was permitted to continue its movement in the direction of the Karan railway station.

From December 3, 2014, he commanded the defense of Donetsk Airport until the premises of the building were fully destroyed. He then commanded the withdrawal of Ukrainian forces to Pisky.

On September 21, 2019, he was appointed the commander of the Air Assault Forces (Ukraine). On July 21, 2021, he was dismissed from the post.

However, on July 29, 2021, he was appointed as the Deputy Commander-in-Chief of the Armed Forces of Ukraine.

Military ranks 
 Major general (5 December 2018)
 Lieutenant general (5 December 2019)

References

Notes 

Ivan Chernyakhovsky National Defense University of Ukraine alumni
1979 births
Living people
Military personnel from Chernivtsi
Ukrainian military personnel of the 2022 Russian invasion of Ukraine